Kudryavtsevo is a rural locality (a village) in Gorod Vyazniki, Vyaznikovsky District, Vladimir Oblast, Russia. The population was 39 as of 2010.

Geography 
Kudryavtsevo is located 16 km east of Vyazniki (the district's administrative centre) by road. Perovo is the nearest rural locality.

References 

Rural localities in Vyaznikovsky District